Mollahat is an upazila of Bagerhat District in the Division of Khulna, Bangladesh.

History
Mollahat Thana was established in 1967 and was turned into an upazila in 1983.

During the War of Liberation (1971) a battle between the freedom fighters and the Pakistani troops was fought at Charkulia in which about 200 Pakistani soldiers including a captain were killed.

There is a War of Liberation Memorial monument at Charkulia.

Geography
It has 21,465 households and a total area of 187.88 km2.

Mollahat Upazila (bagerhat district) with an area of 187.44 km2, is bounded by kalia upazila on the north, fakirhat and chitalmari upazilas on the south, Chitalmari, tungipara and gopalganj sadar upazilas on the east, terokhada and rupsa upazilas on the west. Main rivers are madhumati, Atharbanki, Chitra; noted depressions: Kenduar Beel and Kodaliar Beel.

Demographics
According to the 1991 Bangladesh census, Mollahat had a population of 116,729. Males constituted 50.52% of the population, and females 49.48%. The population aged 18 or over was 56,893. Mollahat had an average literacy rate of 31.6% (7+ years), compared to the national average of 32.4%.

Mollahat (Town) consists of 8 mouzas with an area of 8.79 km2. It has a population of 10708; male 51.83%, female 48.17%. The density of population is 1218 per km2. The literacy rate among the town people is 36%. The town has one dakbungalow.

At the 1991 Census, 75.01% of the population were Muslim, 24.87% Hindu and 0.12% followed other religions.

Literacy and educational institutions Average literacy 31.6%; male 36.8% and female 26.2%. Educational institutions: college 3, high school 13, government primary school 58, non-government primary school 19 and madrasa 8, noted of which are Angra Government Primary School (1918) and Madartali Model Government Primary School (1928).

Points of interest
There is a single domed mosque at Kulia union.

Administration
Mollahat Upazila is divided into seven union parishads: Atjuri, Chunkhola, Gangni, Gaola, Kodalia, Kulia, and Udaypur. The union parishads are subdivided into 59 mauzas and 102 villages.

Religious institutions
There are 267 mosques, 72 temples and 2 churches, the most noted of which are the single-domed Mosque and Matiargati temple.

See also
Upazilas of Bangladesh
Districts of Bangladesh
Divisions of Bangladesh

References

 
Upazilas of Bagerhat District